The Men's England Hockey League is a field hockey league organized by England Hockey that features men's teams from England and Wales.

Format

Regular season
There are 62 teams in the league, the top tier consists of a Premier Division of twelve teams. Below this is tier two, which consists of two ten-team Division One regional teams (North and South). The third tier consists of three regional conferences North, West, and East, all consisting of ten teams. The teams play each other home and away during an 18 week season from September to April. The league has a winter break between December and February.  The winners of the Premier Division regular season automatically qualify to play in the Euro Hockey League.

League Finals Weekend
The top four Premier Division teams from the regular season qualify for the League Finals Weekend. The team that wins this tournament will be overall champions of the Men's England Hockey League and will qualify to play in the Euro Hockey League. If the team finishing top of the Premier Division at the end of the regular season also wins the League Finals Weekend tournament, the tournament runners-up will qualify as England's second team in the Euro Hockey League.

2022–23 teams

List of champions
The Men's National League was introduced for the first time in 1974–75.

Champions

By club

By region

Premiership Tournament/Super Cup winners

See also
England Hockey Men's Championship Cup
Women's England Hockey League
England Hockey Women's Championship Cup

References

 
!
1974 establishments in England
Sports leagues established in 1974
Eng